Statistics of American Soccer League II in season 1980.

League standings

ASL All-Stars

Playoffs

Bracket

Conference finals

Championship final

References

American Soccer League II (RSSSF)

	

American Soccer League (1933–1983) seasons
2